Severyn is the Ukrainian masculine given name. It may refer to:

Severyn Nalyvaiko (? - 1597) a leader of the Ukrainian Cossacks, the leader of the Nalyvaiko Uprising.
Severyn Shekhovych (1829-1872) a Ukrainian journalist and writer.
 Severyn Danylovych (1860-1931) a Ukrainian writer and activist.
Severyn Levytskyi (1890-1962) a Plast activist.
Yuriy Severyn (1927-2002) a Ukrainian painter.
Severyn Palydovych (b. 1938) a Ukrainian singer.

See also
 Severin (given name)
 Seweryn